Frank Toto'a Manumaleuna (May 9, 1956 – June 1, 2022) was an American football linebacker who played three seasons with the Kansas City Chiefs of the National Football League (NFL). He was drafted by the Chiefs in the fourth round of the 1979 NFL Draft. He first enrolled at the University of California, Los Angeles before transferring to De Anza College and lastly San José State University. Manumaleuna attended Phineas Banning High School in Los Angeles, California. He was also a member of the Oakland Invaders and Portland Breakers of the United States Football League (USFL). Manumaleuna died on June 1, 2022, in Las Vegas, Nevada.

Early years
Manumaleuna participated in high school football, basketball, baseball and track at Phineas Banning High School.

College career
Manumaleuna sustained a spine and neck injury during his only game for the UCLA Bruins as a freshman in 1974 in Knoxville during a 17–17 tie with the Tennessee Volunteers. However, he earned Chevrolet Player of the Game honors after making 25 tackles during the game. He also played one year of basketball for the Bruins.  However, the UCLA medical staff would not clear him to resume football activities.

Manumaleuna then played two years of college football at De Anza College and averaged fifteen yards per carry as a fullback. He transferred to play for the San Jose State Spartans from 1977 to 1978. He was inducted into the San Jose State University Sports Hall of Fame.

Professional career
Manumaleuna was selected by the Kansas City Chiefs of the NFL with the 85th pick in the 1979 NFL Draft. He played in 35 games, starting 29, for the Chiefs from 1979 to 1981. He played in 36 games, all starts, for the USFL's Oakland Invaders from 1983 to 1984. Manumaleuna played for the Portland Breakers of the USFL during the 1985 season.

Personal life
Manumaleuna’s son Brandon Manumaleuna also played in the NFL. Frank's nephew Eathyn Manumaleuna spent time during the 2014 off-season with the New York Giants and New England Patriots.

References

External links
Just Sports Stats
College stats

1956 births
2022 deaths
Players of American football from Hawaii
American sportspeople of Samoan descent
American football linebackers
American football fullbacks
UCLA Bruins football players
UCLA Bruins men's basketball players
De Anza Dons football players
San Jose State Spartans football players
Kansas City Chiefs players
Oakland Invaders players
Boston/New Orleans/Portland Breakers players
People from Laie
American men's basketball players
Players of American football from Los Angeles